Drzewce  is a village in the administrative district of Gmina Nałęczów, within Puławy County, Lublin Voivodeship, in eastern Poland.

The village has a population of 600.

References

Drzewce